IC 434 is a bright emission nebula in the constellation Orion. It was discovered on February 1, 1786 by William Herschel.  The Horsehead Nebula is a dark nebula silhouetted against it.

See also
 Orion molecular cloud complex

References

Gallery

External links
 
 IC 434
 

Emission nebulae
0434
Orion (constellation)
Orion molecular cloud complex